Lena Liepe, born 1962, is a Swedish art historian, who since 2017 is professor in art history at Linnaeus University, Sweden. She has worked at the University of Lund, Sweden, University of Tromsø, Norway and University of Oslo, Norway. Her main research areas are medieval art history, art theory and method, genus perspective on medieval art, and icelandic medieval illuminated manuscripts. In her research she has focused on how museums in Sweden grew out of 19th century displays of medieval church art, and for the moment she completes a major work on the importance of relics in medieval church art. Her broad approach to the studies of medieval art and illuminations have had a deep impact in the Nordic research in the different areas she has covered, and she has also been recognized internationally.

She is a member of Norwegian Academy of Science and Letters, International Centre for Medieval Art (ICMA) and Swedish Art Critics Association (AICA). She has received two of the largest prices for research in the humanities in the Nordic countries: Jarl Gallén’s price 2016 to “a renowned Nordic medieval historian”, and Gad Rausing’s price 2019 for “her pioneering and profound studies of Nordic medieval art”.

Bibliography 
 1995 Den medeltida träskulpturen i Skåne. Produktion och förvärv (The Medieval Wooden Sculpture in Scania. Production and Acquisition). Skånsk senmedeltid och renässans 14, Lund: Lund University Press (Ph.D.-thesis).
 1995 Den medeltida träskulpturen i Skåne. En bilddokumentation (The Medieval Wooden Sculpture in Scania. A documentation in Pictures). Skånsk senmedeltid och renässans 15, Lund: Lund University Press (volume of pictures for Ph.D.-thesis).
 2001 Medieval Stone Churches of Northern Norway. The Interpretation of Architecture as a Historical Process, Tromsø: Ravnetrykk 25.
 2003 Den medeltida kroppen. Kroppens och könets ikonografi i nordisk medeltid (The Medieval Body. The Iconography of Body and Genus in Nordic Middle Ages), Lund : Nordic Academic Press.
 2003 Tegn, symbol og tolkning: Om forståelse og fortolkning af middelalderens bilder (Sign, Symbol and Interpretation. On Understanding and Interpretation of Pictures in the Middle Ages), Köpenhamn: Museum Tusculanum.
 2007 Konst och visuell kultur i Sverige. Före 1809 (Art and Visual Culture in Sweden. Before 1809), Stockholm: Atlantis.
 2009 Studies in Icelandic Fourteenth Century Book Painting, Reykholt: Snorrastofa, rit. vol. VI.
 2018 A Case for the Middle Ages. The Public Display of Medieval Church Art in Sweden 1847–1943, Stockholm: The Royal Swedish Academy of Letters, History and Antiquities.

References

External links
 Lena Liepe
 Publications in the British Library
 Publications in Library of Congress

Academic staff of Linnaeus University
Academic staff of the University of Oslo
Academic staff of the University of Tromsø
Living people
1962 births
Swedish art historians
Members of the Norwegian Academy of Science and Letters